The Tower of the Winds or the Horologion of Andronikos Kyrrhestes is an octagonal Pentelic marble clocktower in the Roman Agora in Athens that functioned as a horologion or "timepiece". It is considered the world's first meteorological station. Unofficially, the monument is also called Aerides, which means Winds. The structure features a combination of sundials, a water clock, and a wind vane. It was designed by Andronicus of Cyrrhus around 50 BC, but according to other sources, might have been constructed in the 2nd century BC before the rest of the forum.  The Athens Ephorate of Antiquities performed restoration work, cleaning and conserving the structure, between 2014 and 2016.

Site
In antiquity it was topped by a weather vane-like Triton that indicated the wind direction. Below the frieze depicting the eight wind deities—Boreas (N), Kaikias (NE), Apeliotes (E), Eurus (SE), Notus (S), Livas (SW), Zephyrus (W), and Skiron (NW)—there are eight sundials. In its interior, time was determined by a water clock, driven by water coming down from the Acropolis. Research has shown that the considerable height of the tower was motivated by the intention to place the sundials and the wind-vane at a visible height on the Agora, effectively making it an early example of a clocktower. According to the testimony of Vitruvius and Varro, Andronicus of Cyrrhus designed the structure. The tower's columns bore capitals of a design now known as "Tower of the Winds Corinthian", although they lack the volutes ordinarily found in Corinthian capitals.

In early Christian times, the building was used as the bell-tower of an Eastern Orthodox church. At Ottoman rule time it was buried up to half its height, and traces of this can be observed in the interior, where Turkish inscriptions may be found on the walls. It was fully excavated in the 19th century by the Archaeological Society of Athens. The thesis that there was an Athens Mevlevi Convent or its ritual hall in the Tower and that the other buildings belonging to the Convent were located around it is an unsubstantiated claim and fabrication. The Tower, which was converted into a Qadirî tekke sometime between 1749 and 1751, was used by Qadirî dervishes to perform their religious rituals for 70 years between 1751 and 1821, and was evacuated after the Greek revolt of 1821.

Legacy
The building became better known outside Greece when details were published in London in the first volume of The Antiquities of Athens (which also described four other ancient Greek buildings). It had been surveyed by James "Athenian" Stuart and Nicholas Revett on an expedition in 1751–54.

Several buildings are based on the design of the Towers of the Winds, including:

 The 18th-century Tower of the Winds on top of the Radcliffe Observatory in Oxford, England, 
 St Pancras Church (1822) designed by William Inwood and his son Henry William Inwood, located in Euston, London. This is a unique Greek-revival church, that features two sets of Caryatids and a tower that was based on the classical Tower of the Winds.
 The Daniel S. Schanck Observatory (1865) an early astronomical observatory at Rutgers University in New Brunswick, New Jersey.
 The mausoleum of the founder of the Greek National Library Panayis Vagliano at West Norwood Cemetery, London. 
 The 15th-century Torre del Marzocco in Livorno.
 The tower on St Luke's Church, West Norwood, in London, designed by Francis Octavius Bedford after he visited Athens on a Society of Dilettanti scholarship circa 1810.
 A similar tower in Sevastopol, built in 1849. 
 The Temple of the Winds, which stands in the grounds of Mount Stewart near Newtownards in Northern Ireland.
 The Carnaby Temple near Carnaby, East Riding of Yorkshire, built in 1770.
 The Maitland Robinson building in Downing College, Cambridge, designed by Quinlan Terry in 1992.
The "Storm Tower" in Bude, Cornwall (1835), by George Wightwick

See also
 Anemoi
 Antikythera mechanism
 Classical compass winds
 History of timekeeping devices

References

Sources

Further reading
 
 
 Duru, Dr. Riza (2021). “The Tower of Winds was neither the Mevlevi Convent of Athens nor Its Ritual Hall”. https://www.academia.edu/45679939.

External links

Tower of the Winds and characters sculpted on it 

Buildings and structures completed in the 1st century BC
Hellenistic architecture
Towers in Greece
Meteorology in history
Ancient Greek buildings and structures in Athens
Octagonal buildings
Roman Athens
Ancient Roman buildings and structures in Greece